A cult of personality has been developing around Xi Jinping since he became General Secretary of the ruling Chinese Communist Party and the regime's paramount leader in 2012.

Background 
After Deng Xiaoping started the Chinese economic reforms and introduced the concept of collective leadership in the late 1970s, there was no longer a cult of personality around Chinese leaders. When Xi came to power in 2012, he started centralizing power and paved the way for a cult of personality.

The Chinese Communist Party has denied that there was any cult of personality. Xie Chuntao, director of the government-funded Central Party School's academic department, claimed the “respect and love” ordinary Chinese felt for Xi was “natural” and “heartfelt” and bore no similarities to a cult of personality.

The Constitution of the Chinese Communist Party forbids all forms of personality cult.

Characteristics 
Since Xi assumed power in 2012, books, cartoons, pop songs and dance routines have honoured his rule. In 2017, the local government of the Jiangxi province told Christians to replace their pictures of Jesus with Xi Jinping.

Writing in the Sydney Morning Herald, Philip Wen notes that “perhaps the most stunning characteristic shared with Mao has been a growing personality cult around Xi fanned by the central propaganda department, which has produced some jarring results: newspaper front-pages dominated by Xi's every move, saccharine music videos professing love and loyalty to the leader.” In May 2016, just prior to the 50th anniversary celebration of Mao's Great Proletarian Cultural Revolution, a “Mao-themed revival show” at the Great Hall of the People featuring revolutionary “red songs” was designed to generate nostalgia for the Mao era, with “giant images of Mao and Xi projected on stage.”

Xi claimed that he carried bags of 110 kilograms of wheat over 3 miles of mountain road without changing shoulder, a feat deemed extraordinary and broadcast by China Central Television during what was described as an image-crafting campaign.

When he was re-elected in 2017, Xi dominated the front page of the People's Daily compared to previous editions, which emphasized a “collective leadership” model.

The political ideology bearing his name, Xi Jinping Thought, was enshrined into the Communist Party's constitution in the 19th National Congress in October 2017 and into the state constitution in 2018. CCTV also showed members of the National People's Congress "crying in happiness" because of Xi Jinping's re-election as president in 2018.

Since October 2017, many universities across China have placed Xi Jinping Thought at the core of their curricula, the first time since Mao Zedong that a Chinese leader has been accorded similar academic stature. Fudan University revised their charter to remove "academic independence and freedom of thought" and include a "pledge to follow the Communist party's leadership", leading to protests among the students. It also said that Fudan University had to “equip its teachers and employees” with Xi Jinping Thought, leading to concerns about the diminishing academic freedom of Fudan.

Former inmates in the Xinjiang internment camps claimed that they were forced to give thanks to the leader by chanting "Long live Xi Jinping."

In October 2018, Hunan TV started airing a game show about Xi Jinping and his ideology. In January 2019, Alibaba released a mobile app for studying Xi Jinping Thought named Xuexi Qiangguo. As of October 2019, it has more than 100 million active users, and is now claimed to be the most downloaded item on Apple's domestic App Store, surpassing social media apps such as WeChat and TikTok (also known as Douyin in Mandarin).

The name of the app is a pun on Xi Jinping's name. Xuéxí can mean "learning" or "learn from Xi."

Apps such as Toutiao, Tencent, and Sina have been forced to use what has been described as "a super algorithm", where the story at the top "has to be about Xi".There are souvenirs containing Xi Jinping's images throughout shops in China.

On 15 June 2020, Xi's birthday, the media run by the Central Party School of the Chinese Communist Party, labelled Xi Jinping Thought as "21st Century Marxism". It claimed that Xi Jinping Thought was the only scientific method to explain the Chinese Miracle in the 21st century. It also claimed to provide the "solution for the modern problems of humankind" and claimed that socialism was better than capitalism.

In October 2017 the CCP Politburo named Xi Jinping lingxiu, a reverent term for "leader" and a title previously only given to Chiang Kai-shek, Mao Zedong and his immediate successor Hua Guofeng. He is also sometimes called the "Great Helmsman", and in July 2018 Li Zhanshu, the Chairman of the Standing Committee of the National People's Congress, referred to Xi as the "eternal core" of the party. On 25 December 2019, the politburo officially named Xi as "People's Leader", a title only Mao held previously.

In 2022, the 20th National Congress of the Communist Party of China added the "Two Establishes and Two Safeguards" into the Party's constitution, which established Xi as the "core" of the Central Committee and the CCP and cemented his polices as guiding rules for the future of China.

See also 
Cult of personality
Mao Zedong's cult of personality
North Korean cult of personality
Nicolae Ceaușescu's cult of personality
Joseph Stalin's cult of personality
Xi Jinping Thought
Accelerator-in-Chief

Notes

References 

Cults of personality
Politics of China
Xi Jinping
People's Republic of China culture
Society of China